Küçük Theatre, which translates to Small Theatre,  is a theatre in Ulus quarter of Altındağ district in Ankara, Turkey. It is operated by the Turkish State Theatres, and it is located in the same building of the Eevkaf Apartmanı, in which the headoffice of the Turkish State Theatres is situated. The building also houses the Oda Theatre.

References

Theatres in Ankara
Ulus, Ankara
Turkish State Theatres